Fifth Street is a census-designated place (CDP) located in the extraterritorial jurisdiction of Stafford within Fort Bend County, Texas, United States. The population was 2,486 at the 2010 census. Fifth Street is within the ZIP code 77477. Therefore, residents of Fifth Street have an address of Stafford, Texas.

History
By the 1980s the development or at minimum the name "Fifth Street" existed. In 2000 it had 2,059 residents. It is a bedroom community of Houston.

Geography

Fifth Street is in northeastern Fort Bend County, near the border with Harris County and between Missouri City and Stafford.

Demographics
As of the census of 2000, there were 2,059 people, 503 households, and 422 families residing in the CDP. The population density was 2,536.8 people per square mile (981.5/km2). There were 537 housing units at an average density of 661.6/sq mi (256.0/km2). The racial makeup of the CDP was 50.90% White, 5.15% African American, 0.15% Native American, 0.10% Asian, 0.05% Pacific Islander, 41.23% from other races, and 2.43% from two or more races. Hispanic or Latino of any race were 90.34% of the population.

There were 503 households, out of which 46.3% had children under the age of 18 living with them, 57.3% were married couples living together, 15.7% had a female householder with no husband present, and 16.1% were non-families. 9.3% of all households were made up of individuals, and 2.4% had someone living alone who was 65 years of age or older. The average household size was 4.09 and the average family size was 4.29.

In the CDP, the population was spread out, with 34.0% under the age of 18, 13.1% from 18 to 24, 32.3% from 25 to 44, 15.6% from 45 to 64, and 5.0% who were 65 years of age or older. The median age was 26 years. For every 100 females, there were 129.5 males. For every 100 females age 18 and over, there were 137.4 males.

The median income for a household in the CDP was $29,773, and the median income for a family was $34,740. Males had a median income of $26,310 versus $17,500 for females. The per capita income for the CDP was $9,697. About 20.4% of families and 21.8% of the population were below the poverty line, including 19.6% of those under age 18 and 22.6% of those age 65 or over.

Government and infrastructure
Fort Bend County does not have a hospital district. OakBend Medical Center serves as the county's charity hospital which the county contracts with.

Education

Fifth Street is within the Fort Bend Independent School District.

Most residents are zoned to Armstrong Elementary School, while some are zoned to Edgar Glover Elementary School. Two secondary schools in Missouri City, Missouri City Middle School and Thurgood Marshall High School, serve Fifth Street.

Before Armstrong opened in August 2008, Fifth Street was divided between Glover Elementary School, E.A. Jones Elementary School, and Quail Valley Elementary School. In 2008 Armstrong took most of Fifth Street.

Prior to April 18, 1959 an elementary school in Missouri City, now E. A. Jones, existed. Quail Valley Elementary School had been occupied by August 1975. Missouri City Junior High School opened in October 1975. Glover opened on August 17, 1994. Marshall High School opened on August 15, 2002. The rebuilt E. A. Jones opened on August 27, 2007. Armstrong opened on August 25, 2008. The rebuilt Missouri City Middle School opened in August 2008.

Parks and recreation
Fort Bend County operates the  Stafford Community Center in Fifth Street.

References

External links
 

Census-designated places in Fort Bend County, Texas
Census-designated places in Texas
Greater Houston